Tommy Bell (March 13, 1923 – July 14, 1994) was an African-American boxer. As a professional, he faced legendary fighters such as Jake LaMotta, Fritzie Zivic, and Kid Gavilán. Bell fought for the welterweight title against Sugar Ray Robinson in 1946.

Early years 

Bell was born in Ogelthorpe, Georgia, a son of Shed and Bessie Howard Bell. When he was still a child, his family relocated to Youngstown, Ohio, a steel-production center near the Pennsylvania border. Bell attended Scienceville High School before embarking on his amateur career.

Boxing career 

During his career as an amateur boxer, Bell won 22 fights and lost three. In 1942, he won the Ohio AAU Welterweight Championship. In his professional career, Bell participated in 82 fights and won 59. At one point in his career, he scored 34 wins in a row.  In a five day period, he once knocked out five opponents. Bell was best known for a 15-round welterweight title loss to Sugar Ray Robinson, on December 20, 1946.

Later years 

Bell returned to Youngstown after retiring from the ring in 1951. He was active as a coach and trainer, and in 1985, he was inducted into the community's Curbstone Coaches Hall of Fame.

References 

1923 births
1994 deaths
African-American boxers
American male boxers
Boxers from Youngstown, Ohio
Welterweight boxers
20th-century African-American sportspeople